27 Songs From Barcelona is the third album from the Swedish band I'm from Barcelona. While touring around the world with their two latest releases Let Me Introduce My Friends (2006) and Who Killed Harry Houdini (2008), the members of I'm from Barcelona compiled the songs for 27 Songs from Barcelona.

Inspired by Kiss' simultaneous release of four solo albums in 1978, 27 Songs from Barcelona features one solo song for every of the 27 members of I'm from Barcelona.

In preparation, a daily release was made online, a song per day, made available through the band's official website, to prepare for the eventual launch.

The album was released on vinyl in a limited edition and in a set of 3 records. The album was also made available on their website free to stream and for downloads.

Track listing

References

I'm from Barcelona albums
2007 albums